Van Santvoord Merle-Smith (June 22, 1889 – November 9, 1943) was a United States soldier, lawyer, and investment banker, who served as Third Assistant Secretary of State from 1920 to 1921, and as Executive Intelligence Officer to General Douglas MacArthur during World War II.

Early life
Van Santvoord Merle-Smith was born in Oyster Bay, New York in 1889.  He was the son of Zaidee Van Santvoord (1858–1943) and Rev. Wilton Merle Smith (1856–1923), D.D., pastor of Central Presbyterian Church in New York City, a congregation of the Presbyterian Church in the United States of America.  His mother was the daughter of Alfred Van Santvoord.  His older sister was Dorothy (née Merle-Smith) Pyle (1887–1982) and his younger sister was Anita (née Merle-Smith) Knight (1891–1971).

He was educated at Princeton University, graduating in 1911, and at Harvard Law School, graduating in 1914.

Career
During World War I, Merle-Smith served in the United States Army's 165th Infantry Regiment, achieving the rank of captain.  Captain Merle-Smith was awarded the Distinguished Service Cross for his actions on July 28, 1918, when he assumed command of his company during combat with the enemy near Villers-sur-Fère after his major was killed during the course of battle.  Merle-Smith had attained the rank of major by the time he left the army.

After the war, Merle-Smith served as Third Assistant Secretary of State from June 24, 1920, to March 4, 1921, during the administration of President of the United States Woodrow Wilson.

After leaving the United States Department of State, Merle-Smith joined the New York City law firm of Pratt & McAlpin.  He later became an investment banker 
with Roosevelt & Son.  Like his grandfather Alfred Van Santvoord, Merle-Smith developed a passion for yachting, and was a prominent member of the Seawanhaka Corinthian Yacht Club.

Merle-Smith returned to the United States Army with the outbreak of World War II, achieving the rank of colonel.  He became Executive Intelligence Officer for General Douglas MacArthur.  In 1943, Colonel Merle-Smith suffered a mental breakdown brought on by heavy staff work in the South Pacific.

Personal life
On June 20, 1916, Merle-Smith married Kate Grosvenor Fowler (1888–1982). She was the daughter of Kate Grosvenor and Eldridge M. Fowler, and the granddaughter of Col. W. M. Grosvenor.  The couple would eventually have four children:

 Van Santvoord Merle-Smith Jr. (1917–2003), who was the chaplain of the Moravian Seminary in Bethlehem, Pennsylvania.
 Nancy Merle-Smith (1921–1991), who married to Robert C. Stover in 1948.
 Fowler Merle-Smith (1926–1998), who was an administrator and teacher at the Buckley School in New York City and later at Princeton Day School.
 Margaret Merle-Smith (1929–1965), who married William St. Clair Childs (1928–1965), in December 1964. They died shortly thereafter in a plane crash in February 1965.

Three months after his breakdown, Merle-Smith died in Cove Neck, New York, on November 9, 1943.  His funeral was attended by more than 400 people.

References

External links
 

1889 births
1943 deaths
United States Assistant Secretaries of State
Recipients of the Distinguished Service Cross (United States)
Harvard Law School alumni
Princeton University alumni